The Rumsey Fire in Yolo County, California was the largest fire of the 2004 California wildfire season. The fire burned from October 10 through October 16, 2004 destroying  of land. Four days after the fire broke out, officials confirmed that it was the work of an arsonist. Of the structures destroyed by the fire, four were unoccupied mobile homes and the fifth structure was the CAL FIRE Berryessa lookout tower.

References

2004 California wildfires
Wildfires in Yolo County, California
California wildfires caused by arson